Giuseppe Pistocchi (1744–1814) was an Italian architect of the Neoclassic style, active mainly near his natal city of Faenza.

Biography
Pistocchi was born in Faenza. His father, a sculptor and stuccoist, sent him to work with the architect Giuseppe Boschi (il Carloncino). A patron, the archbishop Cantoni of Ravenna, arranged for him to travel to Rome in 1762. In 1754 he directed the restoration of the Apostolic palace in Pesaro, and completed the facade of Santa Maria degli Angeli and restoration of the church Sant' Agostino. Returning to Faenza, he directed construction of the Oratorio della Confraternita di S. Matteo. In 1768 he rebuilt the high altar of the Cathedral. In 1775 he worked in the Palazzo Bandini-Spada. Between 1780 and 1782 he decorated the cupola of the Duomo of Ravenna. Between 1780 and 1787 he directed the construction of the Communal theater in Faenza.

Other works include:
1781: design for the New Seminary of Faenza.
1785: Completes Galleria of the Cento Pacifici.
1786: Completes Palazzo Gessi and Palazzo Conti.
1787: pursues restoration of the Palazzo Pasolini Dall’Onda.
1788: receives the title of Cavaliere dello Speron D’Oro.
1790: enters, but loses, in a design competition for the theater of La Fenice in Venice. 
1790: He completes the convent of San Filippo in Faenza.
1795: Begins work in Palazzo Milzetti.
1796-1802: works creating canal near Faenza and port authorities in Imola
1798-1809: Works in plans for the Piazza in front of the Duomo of Milan.
1799: designs the civil hospital of Cesena and a giant triumphal arch.
1800: designs a column to celebrate the battle of Marengo. 
1802 - 1813: He designs various works in Milan, and a Palazzo for the Legation to Paris from the Kingdom of Italy
1806-1807: designs Civic Cemetery in Faenza. 
1805-1810: plans the reconstruction of the Castle of Imola (rocca d’Imola). 
1814: he dies in Faenza.

References
Exhibition in Palazzo Mizetti

1744 births
1814 deaths
People from Faenza
18th-century Italian architects
19th-century Italian architects
Italian neoclassical architects
Architects from Emilia-Romagna